was a Japanese photographer notable for his work in fashion and photojournalism.

Tamura was born in Sapporo, Hokkaidō. Shigeru was an assumed name; Tamura's personal name was probably Torashige. He studied photography at the Oriental School of Photography (Orientaru Shashin Gakkō);  graduating in 1929. With Yoshio Watanabe, in 1935 he set up a studio for advertising and other photography in Ginza, Tokyo. He was highly successful as a fashion photographer, notably in work for the magazine  Fujin Gahō from 1937. Together with Ken Domon and others, he set up the Young People's Photojournalism Research Society (Seinen Hōdōshashin Kenkyūkai) in 1938.

Tamura emerged from the war as a photographer of social issues in Japan, approaching them from a pacifist and left-wing angle. He also traveled, producing books on the Arab world and North Vietnam. In 1963 he set up the Japan Realist Photographers Association (Nihon Riarizumu Shashin Shūdan).

In the 1970s Tamura documented the topography and cultural patrimony of Japan. He died in 1987.

Note

Books by Tamura
 Gendai Nihon no hyakunin. Tokyo: Bungei Shunju, 1953. 
 Arabu no shinjitsu. Text by Kai Shizuma. Tokyo: Chikuma Shobō, 1958. 
 Kita Betonamu no shōgen: Mina koroshi sakusen no jittai. Tokyo: Shin Nihon Shuppansha, 1967. 
 Minna ga eiyū: Shashin de miru Kita-Betonamu hōkoku. Tokyo: Mainichi Shinbunsha, 1965. 
 Chibetto. Tokyo: Kenkōsha, 1966. 
 Nihon no fūdo to bunka. Tokyo: Kenkōsha, 1976. 
 Waga kamera no sengoshi (My postwar photographic story). Tokyo: Shin Nihon Shuppansha, 1982. A survey of Tamura's work.
 Tamura Shigeru no shashin jinsei. Tokyo: Shin Nihon Shuppansha, 1986. . 
 Gudō no shashinka Tamura Shigeru. Tokyo: Kōyō Shuppansha, 1990. .

Sources and links
 Nihon shashinka jiten / 328 Outstanding Japanese Photographers. Kyoto: Tankōsha, 2000. 
 Shashinka 100-nin: Kao to sakuhin / 100 photographers, profiles and photographs. Special 20th anniversary supplement to Camera Mainichi, 1974. 
Shigeru Tamura at PhotoGuide Japan

1909 births
1987 deaths
Japanese photojournalists
People from Sapporo
Photography in Vietnam